Dubrovnik dialect may refer to:

 Shtokavian dialect
 Dubrovnik subdialect